The splendid sea perch (Callanthias allporti) is a splendid perch of the family Callanthiidae, found in the eastern Indian Ocean and the southwest Pacific, at depths of between 20 and 100 m.  Its length is up to 30 cm.

References 

 
 Tony Ayling & Geoffrey Cox, Collins Guide to the Sea Fishes of New Zealand,  (William Collins Publishers Ltd, Auckland, New Zealand 1982) 

Callanthiidae
Fish described in 1876
Taxa named by Albert Günther